Christel Lee (born on October 25, 1990, Bloomington, Indiana, United States) is a Korean American-Canadian violinist. She has studied at the Juilliard School, at the Kronberg Academy, and at the Munich College for Music and Theatre.

Lee won first prize at the 11th International Jean Sibelius Violin Competition in Helsinki in 2015.

References 

American classical violinists
International Jean Sibelius Violin Competition prize-winners
1990 births
Living people
American people of Korean descent
Canadian people of Korean descent
Musicians from Bloomington, Indiana
Juilliard School alumni
University of Music and Performing Arts Munich alumni
21st-century classical violinists
Women classical violinists